Ashinsky District is an administrative and municipal district (raion), one of the twenty-seven in Chelyabinsk Oblast, Russia. It is located in the west of the oblast. Its administrative center is the town of Asha. As of the 2010 Census, the total population of the district (excluding the administrative center) was 32,898.

History
The district was established in 1961.

Administrative and municipal status
Within the framework of administrative divisions, it has a status of a town with territorial district—a unit equal in status to administrative districts—the full name of which is The Town of Asha and Ashinsky District. As a municipal division, it is incorporated as Ashinsky Municipal District.

References

Notes

Sources

Districts of Chelyabinsk Oblast
States and territories established in 1961